The Iran men's national under-21 volleyball team represents Iran in men's under-21 volleyball Events, it is controlled and managed by the Islamic Republic of Iran Volleyball Federation (I.R.I.V.F.) and takes part in international volleyball competitions.

Results

FIVB U21 World Championship
 Champions   Runners-up   3rd place   4th place

Other tournaments
Islamic Solidarity Games
2017 –  Champions

References

External links
Official Website

U
National men's under-21 volleyball teams
Volleyball in Iran